The CASC CH-901 is a loitering munition developed by the China Aerospace Science and Technology Corporation (CASC) in 2016. The drone can be deployed in several ways; it can be carried by soldiers in the field and launched out of a tube, as well as from vehicles, aircraft, and UCAVs. In 2020 China unveiled a truck fitted with 48 launch tubes for CH-901 loitering munitions.

The CH-901 can also be launched from the new FH-97 unveiled at Airshow China in 2021.

Operation 
The CH-901 can be readied and launched from its tube in 3 minutes. The drone then dashes to its target area at 180 km/h (110 mph), where it flies around for up to 60 minutes, at 100 km/h (62 mph) and at an altitude of 100 m (330 ft) to 150 m (490 ft). Once a target is located using the drones electro-optical guidance, it dives onto its target at 288 km/h (179 mph) and detonates its warhead. The CH-901 can carry a 3.5 kg (7.5 lbs) high explosive warhead, a fragmentation charge, a shaped charge for penetrating armor, or a camera for reconnaissance. The drones can also be launched in waves to swarm and overwhelm enemies.

Specifications

References

External links 

Loitering munition